The Roman Catholic Diocese of Callao is a diocese located in the city of Callao in the Ecclesiastical province of Lima in Peru.

History
29 April 1967: Established as Diocese of Callao from the Metropolitan Archdiocese of Cusco

Bishops

Ordinaries
Eduardo Picher Peña (3 August 1967 – 31 May 1971), appointed Archbishop of Huancayo
Luis Vallejos Santoni (20 September 1971 – 14 January 1975), appointed Archbishop of Cuzco
Ricardo Durand Flórez, S.J. (14 January 1975 – 17 August 1995), Archbishop (personal title)
Miguel Irízar Campos, C.P. (17 August 1995 - 12 December 2011)
José Luis Del Palacio y Pérez-Medel (12 December 2011 - 15 April 2020)
Luis Alberto Barrera Pacheco, M.C.C.I (17 April 2021 - present)

Coadjutor bishop
Miguel Irizar Campos, C.P. (1989-1995)

Auxiliary bishop
Javier Augusto Del Río Alba (2004-2006), appointed Coadjutor Archbishop of Arequipa

See also
Roman Catholicism in Peru

Sources
 GCatholic.org
 Catholic Hierarchy
  Diocese website

Roman Catholic dioceses in Peru
Roman Catholic Ecclesiastical Province of Lima
Christian organizations established in 1967
Roman Catholic dioceses and prelatures established in the 20th century